"Dangerously in Love 2" is a song written and produced by Beyoncé and Errol McCalla, Jr. The ballad was first recorded by Destiny's Child for their third studio album Survivor (2001), under the title "Dangerously in Love". The song later became the title track to Beyoncé's debut album with some minor adjustments instrumentally. "Dangerously in Love 2" is an R&B ballad, the lyrics of which detail romantic obsession.

"Dangerously in Love 2" received generally positive response from music critics, who wrote that the song effectively shows the vocal capabilities of Beyoncé. It won a Grammy Award for Best Female R&B Vocal Performance at the 46th Annual Grammy Awards. Though not released as a single, "Dangerously in Love 2" charted at number 57 the US Billboard Hot 100 chart and at number 17 on the Hot R&B/Hip-Hop Songs chart. Beyoncé performed the ballad at the 46th Grammy Awards, the Verizon Ladies First Tour, the Dangerously in Love Tour, and The Beyoncé Experience.

Background and composition
"Dangerously in Love" was written and produced by Beyoncé and Errol McCalla, Jr. It was recorded for the Destiny's Child album, Survivor (2001). Beyoncé re-recorded the song at the SugarHill Studios in Houston, Texas in 2002 for her debut solo album, Dangerously in Love. Her version, which was titled "Dangerously in Love 2", features a modified arrangement. It was set as a remix track, but later became the title track to her debut studio album.

"Dangerously in Love" is a moderate R&B ballad pacing in medium time. It was written in the key of F major, and moves at a moderate tempo set at 100 beats per minute. Vocal elements of the song range from E3 to D5. "Dangerously in Love" is backed by piano and thumping drum instrumentation. Many music critics noted it to be musically similar to the original Destiny's child version. Lyrically, the song is about being romantically obsessed, as indicated in the chorus: "I am in love with you / You set me free / I can't do this thing called life without you here with me". According to Lisa Verrico of The Times, "Dangerously in Love 2" bears resemblance to Janet Jacksons work if viewed from a "flirty" perspective.

Reception
"Dangerously in Love" received mostly positive reviews from music critics. Natalie Nichols of Los Angeles Times stated that the song is just one of many wailing ballads designed to demonstrate "the soulful bleating of Beyonce, the centerpiece of R&B star trio Destiny's Child." Sal Cinquemani of Slant Magazine gave a mixed review of the song, stating that it seemed a bit dated and that it was "a near-carbon copy of Survivor’s melodramatic 'Dangerously in Love' [that] is completely superfluous." While covering the 2004 reunion of Destiny's Child, Jet Magazine considered the song a major hit of Beyoncé's debut album. In an article from Teen Ink, the song was noted as one of the top "lush ballads" of the album. "Dangerously in Love" won in the category Best Female R&B Vocal Performance at the 46th Grammy Awards on February 8, 2004.

Beyoncé's version charted on a few Billboard component charts, despite not officially being released as a single. "Dangerously in Love" made its first chart appearance on the US Hot R&B/Hip-Hop Songs chart at number 73 on July 3, 2004. For the following seven weeks, the song kept on charting in the lower positions of the chart, until it was titled as the greatest gainer on the chart issue dated August 21, 2004, ascending 28 places from number 71 to number 43. Its entry on the US Radio Songs chart at number 75, prompted its debut on the US Billboard Hot 100 issue dated September 18, 2004 at number 76. "Dangerously in Love 2" was propelled to number 60 on the Hot 100 chart the following week as it made the largest chart move on the Radio Songs chart by ascending to number 59. The song peaked at number 17 on the US Hot R&B/Hip-Hop Songs chart on September 25, 2004, and at number 57 US Billboard Hot 100 on October 2, 2004. On June 14, 2006, the song was certified gold by the Recording Industry Association of America (2006) for sales of over 500,000 ringtones. As at October 6, 2010, "Dangerously in Love 2" had sold around 130,000 digital downloads in the United States.

Live performances

Beyoncé performed "Dangerously in Love" live for the first time at the Pepsi Arena in Albany, New York in 2001. The performance was also part of the setlist for their World Tour. Beyoncé also famously performed the song at the 46th Grammy Awards on February 8, 2004, where it won in the category of Best Female R&B Vocal Performance. Beyoncé was wearing a long, glittery turquoise and silver dress. She positioned herself between the edges of a giant picture frame and sung "Dangerously in Love 2" as if she were in a living oil painting. She was joined by seventeen backup singers, musicians and dancers. At the end, she held out her hand and a dove landed in her outstretched palm. Jon Wiederhorn of MTV News commented that the performance was "nothing short of extravagant."

Beyoncé also added the song to the track-listing of her first solo-tour Dangerously in Love Tour, notably at Wembley Arena in London, United Kingdom. There she performed a special rendition of the song that came in at well over 8-minutes. During the Verizon Ladies First Tour which also featured Alicia Keys, Missy Elliott and Tamia, Beyoncé performed "Dangerously in Love 2" in New York City in front of more than 20,000 fans. Before starting her performance, she asked the audience whether they have ever fell in love. As she started to sing, more dancers joined in on smaller and circular platforms. Simultaneously, fire shot from the floor and a long, rectangular screen merged video of flames with images of the performers, seemingly setting them on fire. Shaheem Reid of MTV News complimented the performance writing: "[Beyoncé] had New Yorkers cheering like the Yankees had just won the World Series when she perfectly hit the high note toward the end of 'Dangerously in Love 2'."

On August 5, 2007, Beyoncé performed the song at the Madison Square Garden in Manhattan. While singing, Beyoncé was accompanied by her all-female band, and she incorporated Jill Scott's "He Loves Me" in "Dangerously in Love 2". Shaheem Reid of MTV News praised the performance, writing: "For all the dancing she did, Beyoncé got an equally big — if not more resounding — response for displaying her undeniable vocal ability on the ballads [...] 'Dangerously in Love'."

Beyoncé additionally performed the song on a number of other occasions, including the song as part of her set list on The Beyoncé Experience in Los Angeles and I Am... World Tour during the first stops in the beginning of the tour. In Los Angeles, Beyoncé gave a full-length performance of the song, dressed in a long sequent number that flowed straight down to her feet. It was executed with several female and male backup dancers, and live instrumentation. Jon Pareles of The New York Times praised the performance, stating: "Beyoncé needs no distractions from her singing, which can be airy or brassy, tearful or vicious, rapid-fire with staccato syllables or sustained in curlicued melismas. But she was in constant motion, strutting in costumes [...]". Although the song was performed on selected dates of the I Am... World Tour, it was not included on the physical release of the tour on DVD/CD. The song was also performed during the I Am... Yours 2009 Las Vegas revue show, in a medley that included an acoustic version of "Sweet Dreams" and a cover of Anita Baker's song "Sweet Love".

Credits and personnel
Credits taken from Dangerously in Love liner notes.
Vocals: Beyoncé Knowles
Background Vocals: Kelly Rowland, Michelle Williams
Writing: Beyoncé Knowles, Errol McCalla Jr.
Vocal Engineer: Brian Springer
Mix engineer: Dexter Simmons
Guitars: Dan Workman
Additional Guitars: John "Jab" Broussard
Instrument Engineer: Dan Workman
Producing: Beyoncé Knowles, Errol "Poppi" McCalla Jr.

Charts

Weekly charts

Year-end chart

Certifications

References

2000s ballads
2001 songs
2003 songs
Beyoncé songs
Destiny's Child songs
Contemporary R&B ballads
Songs written by Beyoncé
Song recordings produced by Beyoncé
Sequel songs